Davincia is a genus of hymenopteran insects of the family Eulophidae.  It is named after Italian painter Leonardo da Vinci.

See also
 List of organisms named after famous people (born before 1800)

References
 Key to Nearctic eulophid genera 
 Universal Chalcidoidea Database 

Eulophidae
Leonardo da Vinci
Taxa named by Alexandre Arsène Girault